Cristian Rolando Cruz Ortega (born January 2, 1995) is an American former professional soccer player. Cruz was born in the United States, his parents are from Mexico.

References

1995 births
Living people
American soccer players
Association football defenders
Atlético Morelia players
Loros UdeC footballers
Tuxtla F.C. footballers
Yalmakán F.C. footballers
Ascenso MX players
Liga Premier de México players
Tercera División de México players
Soccer players from California
American sportspeople of Mexican descent